The Shanksville-Stonycreek School District is a public school district located in Somerset County, Pennsylvania. The school district serves the borough of Shanksville, Stonycreek Township, and the borough of Indian Lake. According to 2000 U.S. data, it serves a resident population of 2,916.

Schools
The campus is located on Cornerstone Road, in Stonycreek Township, just outside Shanksville.

Extracurriculars
The district offers a variety of clubs, activities and sports.

Cooperative Sports
SSSD contracts with other districts in other sports:
 Berlin Brothersvalley School District – Soccer
 Shade-Central City School District – Track and field as well as football are Shade sports in which eligible Shanksville students may participate. Rifle, golf, and tennis are Shanksville sports in which eligible Shade students may participate.

References

External links
 Shanksville-Stonycreek School District
 PIAA

School districts in Somerset County, Pennsylvania
School districts established in 1929